Christine Morton-Shaw is a British writer of children's books and books for teens. These include picturebooks and educational and novelty titles (most notably the popular 'Stringalongs' series). She is perhaps best known for her more recent work as a Young Adult and Middle-Grade novelist. Her novels to date are The Riddles of Epsilon (which received, among other praise, the VOYA (Voice of Youth Advocates) 'perfect ten' rating in June 2006) and The Hunt for the Seventh. Her works are notable for their spooky atmosphere, an emphasis on mystery and the solving of clues (often in the form of puzzles) and surprising plot twists (or 'paradigm shifts')

Background 
Christine Morton-Shaw grew up in Blackburn, England where she reportedly had several spooky or supernatural experiences. She later moved to Sheffield, England to study at university, later gaining a master's degree (MA) in Creative Writing from Sheffield Hallam University. Before this, she had already had several children's picturebooks published, starting with her debut The Pig that Barked (illustrated by Angie Sage, who shares Morton-Shaw's agent and publisher).

After success with several picturebook titles, Morton-Shaw's career took a turn in 2003, when she signed a publishing deal for the teenage fantasy novel The Riddles of Epsilon with Harpercollins Children's Books UK and US arms. The book, published by the Katherine Tegen imprint in 2005 received much pre-publication hype. Over the following years the book has built-up something of a cult following amongst teenage readers on the internet.

Morton-Shaw's second novel The Hunt for the Seventh is due out from Harper Collins US in September 2008. Little is known about the book's contents at the moment, though Morton-Shaw has hinted on her Myspace page that it is another spooky or supernatural tale involving statues and a stately home.

Work for younger children 
Morton-Shaw's books for younger children include the following
 The 'Stringalongs' series (as Christine Morton)
 The Pig that Barked (as Christine Morton)
 Don't Worry William (as Christine Morton)
 Picnic Farm (as Christine Morton)
 Run, Rabbit, Run (as Christine Morton)
 Itzy Bitzy House
 Magoosy
 Mr Jack: a little dog in a big hurry
 Wake Up, Sleepy Bear

Morton-Shaw has received prizes and honours for her work in this area. Picnic Farm was awarded the Silver Honors by the Parents Choice Foundation, Run Rabbit, Run was awarded best children's illustrated work for four- to eleven-year-olds by the English association (2001), while Wake Up, Sleepy Bear is among the books chosen by the Dollywood Foundation for use in promoting reading among children.

Works for older children and teens 
 The Riddles of Epsilon (2005, Katherine Teen Books)
 The Hunt for the Seventh (2008, Katherine Teen Books)

References

Living people
British children's writers
Alumni of Sheffield Hallam University
Year of birth missing (living people)